Hemimyzon papilio is a species of ray-finned fish in the genus Hemimyzon.

References
 

Hemimyzon
Fish described in 1998